St John of God Bendigo Hospital is a 167-bed private hospital located in central Victoria.

St John of God Health Care acquired Mt Alvernia Mercy Hospital in February 2005, renaming it St John of God Bendigo Hospital.  The private hospital services the City of Bendigo and Central Victoria.

St John of God Bendigo Hospital is a division of St John of God Health Care, a Catholic not-for-profit health care group, serving communities with hospitals, home nursing, and social outreach services throughout Australia, New Zealand and the wider Asia-Pacific region. Currently the hospital is partially non-functional, and struggles to be viable. An entire ward is unused and the hospital is on unsure footing financially.

Facilities 
The 167-bed hospital has six theatres, one endoscopy suite, a cardiac interventional lab and a critical care/intensive care unit, as well as a hydrotherapy pool and gymnasium.

Services
Services provided by St John of God Bendigo Hospital include:
 Medical and surgical care
 Maternity
 Cardiology and coronary care
 Intensive care
 Rehabilitation 
 Cancer treatment
 Obstetrics and gynaecology
 Day surgery
 Elective surgery
 Outpatient services

Social outreach
St John of God Raphael Services provides perinatal infant mental health care in Bendigo. Staffed by mental health clinicians, Raphael Services provide free support for parents and families affected by anxiety, depression and other mental health difficulties during pregnancy and in the postnatal period.

They services also provide counselling and support for parents undergoing prenatal testing or who have experienced pregnancy loss.

St John of God Horizon House program provides safe, stable accommodation and support vulnerable young people aged 16–22 years who are currently experiencing, or are at serious risk of, homelessness. The program supports young people to access education, training and employment opportunities and make the transition to independent living.

In 2017, an additional four units were added to enable the service to support 12 young people in the program.

References

External links
Official website
Sisters of St John of God website

Hospitals in Victoria (Australia)
St John of God Health Care
Buildings and structures in Bendigo